Imagínate may refer to:

Imagínate (Menudo album), 1994
Imaginate (Taxiride album), 1999
Imagínate, a 1999 album by Charlie Cruz
Imaginate, a 1999 album by Raúl Paz, originally Cuba Libre
"Imagínate" (song), a 2009 song by Wisin & Yandel
"Imagínate", a song by Salvador Beltrán
"Imagínate", a 1976 song by Omar Franco
Imagínate, a Colombian television series